"Where Do We Go from Here" is a song recorded by British singer Cliff Richard, released in 1982 as the second single from his album Now You See Me, Now You Don't. The song was written by British singer-songwriter Chris Eaton. The song reached number 22 in Ireland and 27 in Belgium, but only reached number 60 in the UK Singles Chart.

Chart performance

References

External links
 

1982 singles
1982 songs
Cliff Richard songs
Songs written by Chris Eaton (UK musician)